The 3000 and 5000 meters distances for women in the 2013–14 ISU Speed Skating World Cup was contested over six races on six occasions, out of a total of six World Cup occasions for the season, with the first occasion taking place in Calgary, Alberta, Canada, on 8–10 November 2013, and the final occasion taking place in Heerenveen, Netherlands, on 14–16 March 2014. Five of the races were over 3000 metres, and one race was over 5000 metres.

On the first competition weekend in Calgary, Antoinette de Jong of the Netherlands improved the 3000 metres world record for juniors with a time of 4:00.56. The next weekend, in Salt Lake City, she improved it again, this time with a time of 3:59.49, becoming the first junior to achieve a time under four minutes for the distance, a result that was good enough for a bronze medal.

Martina Sáblíková of the Czech Republic successfully defended her title from the previous season, while Claudia Pechstein of Germany repeated her second place, and Yvonne Nauta of the Netherlands came third.

Top three

Race medallists

Standings 
Standings as of 15 March 2014 (end of the season).

References 

 
Women 3000
ISU